Aleksandr Zolotarev (1879-1938) was a Ukrainian politician, statesman and journalist.

Zolotaryov was born into a poor Jewish family. He graduated from the Law faculty of the Moscow State University. In 1898 for his revolutionary activity Zolotaryov was exiled to Kherson Governorate and later Poltava Governorate. In 1904 he emigrated to Austria-Hungary and returned in 1907. In 1915-17 Zolotarev worked in Moscow. In 1917 he returned to Kiev and became a member of the Central Council of Ukraine from Jewish Bund. Along with it Zolotarev was a member of the Kiev city Duma, All-Ukrainian council of workers' deputies and state controller for the General Secretariat of Ukraine.

In November 1917 Zolotarev was appointed an emissary to Odessa. At the end of 1918 he joined Bolsheviks and became a member of the Council of People's Commissars of Ukraine.

Zolotarev fell victim of the Great Purge. On 25 October 1937 he was arrested and executed on 20 January 1938.

Bibliography
Zolotarev, A. Iz istoriï Tsentral’noï Ukraïns’koï Rady—1917 (Out of the history of the Central Ukrainian Council) (Kharkiv 1922)

References

External links
 Aleksandr Zolotarev at the Memorial Book of victims of the Communist Terror

1879 births
1938 deaths
Ukrainian Jews
State controllers of Ukraine
Members of the Central Council of Ukraine
General Jewish Labour Bund politicians
Bolsheviks
Ukrainian politicians before 1991
Emigrants from the Russian Empire to Austria-Hungary
Great Purge victims from Ukraine
Jews executed by the Soviet Union